Tazehabad-e Garaveh (also Romanized as Tāzehābād-e Garāveh; also known as Tāzehābād) is a village in Nasrabad Rural District (Kermanshah Province), in the Central District of Qasr-e Shirin County, Kermanshah Province, Iran. At the 2006 census, its population was 124, in 29 families. The village is populated by Kurds.

References 

Populated places in Qasr-e Shirin County
Kurdish settlements in Kermanshah Province